Great Mills was a large DIY chain, consisting of around 98 stores across the United Kingdom. The business was bought by Focus DIY in December 2000 for £285m, which in turn entered administration in May 2011, with all stores closing by the end of July 2011. Most of the former stores of Focus DIY were sold off by the administrators Ernst & Young in batches to B&Q, Wickes and B&M Bargains (B&M Homestore). 

At its height, Great Mills had approximately 3,500 employees, 90 stores nationwide and over 20,000 products in range.

History

Originally known as Clapton Building Supplies, the first store was opened at Paulton, Somerset in 1972 by Tony Blackburn, an unwell Dulux Dog and a staff of four. The store had a modest turnover of £50,000 but within six months, the turnover had doubled.

In the beginning of the 1990s, Great Mills launched Bay6 (Basics). These stores were identical in size, look and layout to those of rival retailer Wickes. Wickes bought the six Bay6 stores in 1995 from Great Mills' parent company, RMC. Four were already trading, and two were under construction.

An important step forward for the company came in 1992, with the introduction of a new central distribution method of delivering products to its stores. This saved many motorway miles as deliveries were coordinated, rather than having hundreds of suppliers delivering to the same store each day. 

Of the product range, over 70% was delivered by the Great Mills fleet in 2000 two or three times weekly. 

Some of the worst-performing Great Mills stores, at St. Austell, Salisbury and Northallerton, were rebranded in 1994 into the No Frills DIY chain. Other than external signage saying No Frills, the interior of the stores followed no corporate planning as the concept was to sell anything and everything in an attempt to make the loss-making store profitable again. Only St. Austell got close to being in profit before the entire chain was shut with the sale of Great Mills. Whilst none of the stores made a profit before closure, they did significantly reduce their losses.

To further reduce distribution costs, a new Central Distribution Centre was opened in July 1997. The purpose-built development was fully automated and used computer systems to monitor stock control and to make sure deliveries were made on time to stores. 

In 1998, Great Mills appointed Jill Keen from Asda as marketing director, taking over from Peter Bastin.

Sale to Focus
RMC Group put Great Mills up for sale in 2000, as chief executive Peter Young said the business "is not a core part of what we do". Later that year, the business was acquired by Focus Do It All, after they switched their attentions from Homebase. The Great Mill stores were all externally rebranded, though some retained parts of the interior branding. Great Mills had almost 100 stores in the UK at the time of the proposed sale

In 2011, Focus DIY entered administration. Some of the ex-Great Mills were sold off to other retailers, while others were left empty. The original Great Mill flagship store in Paulton stood empty until 2015, when it became an outlet for Wickes. 

In 2017, the Great Mills name was purchased by Do It All and the business relaunched as an online retail store.

References

1972 establishments in the United Kingdom
2000 disestablishments in the United Kingdom
Home improvement companies of the United Kingdom
Retail companies established in 1972
Retail companies disestablished in 2000
Defunct retail companies of the United Kingdom
2000 mergers and acquisitions